Riot-E Riot Entertainment Ltd, was a Finnish media company, focused on SMS content mobile phone games that, despite 20 million euros in venture capital invested in them by corporate giants like Nokia, News Corporation and The Carlyle Group, went bankrupt within two years.

Riot Entertainment managed to create a very positive public image. It seemed as if it had everything going for it: Investors with very deep pockets, relationships with top media brands of the world, contracts with large operators, an extensive worldwide gaming network, a very dynamic public image and worldwide presence. They were possibly the first company to offer highly branded mobile games and worldwide online gaming, years before the mainstream could even dream about such services.

They spent money on refurbishing an exclusive four-storey office with gaming rooms, sauna and a theater for 50 people. They built the first games from scratch and recruited 100 people in one summer, and the almost 24/7 workforce was nourished by daily breakfasts and frequent parties.

On July 4, 2001, RIOT-E’s pay-per-download service had attracted close to 200,000 downloads of X-Men characters and images by subscribers to Japan’s Big Three operators. On July 16, 2001, Riot-E announced that it "will develop interactive games for The Lord of the Rings  fans and gaming communities"

The creditors were out 3.2 million euros. Hewlett-Packard and IBM did not get their leasing fees, BT Ignite ended up providing broadband services without compensation, Hertz will not be getting its car leasing fees, Nokia Ventures with 25 percent ownership, and Softbank UK Ventures with 15 percent ownership had nothing to show, operators in the Philippines (Global Handyphone), Italy (Telecom Italia Mobile – TIM), Spain (Telefónica) and Finland (Radiolinja) and the landlord is missing 157,000 euros worth of rent.

The company was such a spectacular failure that it was the subject of the award-winning documentary Riot On!.

Company slogan: "We don't make games, we create riots."

References

External links
 Helsingin Sanomat

Mass media companies of Finland
Defunct companies of Finland